Robert Warren may refer to:

 Bob Warren (basketball) (1946–2014), basketball player
 Bob Warren (footballer, born 1886) (1886–1963), English professional footballer
 Bob Warren (footballer, born 1927) (1927–2002), English professional footballer
 Robert Warren Griffith known as Bobby Griffith (1963–1983), American LGBT subject
 Robert B. Warren (died 1950), American economist
 Robert Warren (artist) (born 1949), American artist and art instructor
 Robert Warren (Irish politician) (1817–1897), Irish politician
 Robert Warren (musician), Australian bass guitar player
 Robert Warren (ornithologist) (1829–1915), Irish ornithologist
 Robert D. Warren Sr. (1928–2013), American politician and educator
 Robert H. Warren (1917–2010), United States Air Force general
 Robert J. Warren (born 1933), president emeritus of LECO Corporation
 Robert Penn Warren (1905–1989), American poet, novelist, and literary critic
 Robert W. Warren (1925–1998), American politician and judge in Wisconsin
 Robert Warren Miller (born 1933), entrepreneur and sailing champion
 Sir Robert Warren, 1st Baronet (1723–1811), Anglo-Irish landowner and businessman

See also
 Robert de Warren, British former ballet dancer, choreographer and artistic director